Leonard Jones was a Canadian politician.

Leonard Jones may also refer to:

Leonard Jones (footballer)
Leonard Jones (musician) from Levels and Degrees of Light

See also
Len Jones (disambiguation)